The Church of St John the Evangelist is in the Scottish town of Cumnock, Ayrshire. Designed by William Burges for the 3rd Marquess of Bute, it was constructed between 1878 and 1880.

Architecture and fittings
The church is constructed in the Early Decorated style and follows the plan of Burges's Church of All Saints, Murston in Kent. The nave is of four bays and ends in an unfinished tower.

History
The church has some significance as the first ecclesiastical building in Scotland to be lit by electricity.  The Scottish composer James MacMillan played the organ at the church as a young man.

References

Bibliography

External links
The Cumnock Tryst: St John's Church

Category B listed buildings in East Ayrshire
Gothic Revival church buildings in Scotland
Roman Catholic churches completed in 1880
Roman Catholic churches in Scotland
William Burges church buildings
19th-century Roman Catholic church buildings in the United Kingdom